"Girl I'm Gonna Miss You" (sometimes listed as "I'm Gonna Miss You") is a song by German dance-pop group Milli Vanilli. It was released in July 1989 as the third single from their debut album, All or Nothing (1988), as well as its American counterpart, Girl You Know It's True (1989). The single was a success, hitting the number one spot on the US Billboard Hot 100 chart and being certified Gold by the Recording Industry Association of America. The song also reached number one in Austria, Belgium, Canada, the Netherlands and Switzerland, number two in Ireland, the United Kingdom and West Germany, and number three in Australia.

Critical reception
Richard Lowe from Smash Hits wrote, "The Nilli's song is quite sweet. It's got a nice melody, gently plopping synths and a tasteful horn solo. Why, one could almost forgive them their trousers."

Charts

Weekly charts

Year-end charts

Certifications

References

1980s ballads
1989 singles
1989 songs
Arista Records singles
Hansa Records singles
Billboard Hot 100 number-one singles
Cashbox number-one singles
Contemporary R&B ballads
Dutch Top 40 number-one singles
Milli Vanilli songs
Number-one singles in Austria
Number-one singles in Switzerland
RPM Top Singles number-one singles
Song recordings produced by Frank Farian
Songs written by Frank Farian
Songs written by Peter Bischof-Fallenstein
Ultratop 50 Singles (Flanders) number-one singles